Bar-Ilan University is a public research university in Ramat Gan, Tel Aviv District, Israel.

Bar-Ilan may also refer to:

 David Bar-Ilan (1930–2003), Israeli pianist, author and newspaper editor
 Judit Bar-Ilan (1958–2019), Israeli computer scientist
 Meir Bar-Ilan (1880–1949), Orthodox rabbi, author, and Religious Zionist activist
 Bar-Ilan Street, a street in Jerusalem
 A 2009 peace address by Benjamin Netanyahu

See also
 

Hebrew-language surnames